Jupiter Airlines was an airline based in Sharjah, United Arab Emirates. The carrier initially served domestic routes within the United Arab Emirates, but has added various key cities in the Middle East to its list of destinations. In December 2004, the airline launched a service between Dubai and Baghdad (Iraq). On February 25, 2009, Jupiter Airlines launched a service between Dubai and Mosul, Iraq. There was also a service between Dubai and Basra.

References

Defunct airlines of the United Arab Emirates
Airlines established in 1996
Airlines disestablished in 2010
Emirati companies established in 1996